Trust Doctor or Trust Senior House Officer is a term applied to a doctor who is working in the National Health Service (NHS) in a non-training post, usually at senior house officer level. Doctors doing Trust Doctor jobs may subsequently secure an "approved post" and complete specialist training, but many others end up becoming Staff grade or Middle grade, career posts without specialist recognition. A survey by the British Medical Association showed that many of the doctors accepting Trust Doctor posts are from overseas who may settle for these posts despite having adequate qualifications. Concerns of exploitation have been raised.

The term "trust" derives from the fact that the doctor is contracted by the NHS trust rather than by the deanery that supervises local medical education.

References

Medical education in the United Kingdom
Healthcare occupations in the United Kingdom
National Health Service (England)